Chełm Voivodeship was a unit of administrative division and local government in Poland in years 1975–1998, superseded by Lublin Voivodeship. Its capital city was Chełm.

Major cities and towns (population in 1995)
 Chełm (69,100)
 Krasnystaw (20,600)

See also
 Voivodeships of Poland

Former voivodeships of Poland (1975–1998)
History of Lublin Voivodeship